The following lists events that happened during 1836 in New Zealand.

Incumbents

Regal and viceregal
Head of State – King William IV
Governor of New South Wales – Major-General Sir Richard Bourke

Government and law
British Resident in New Zealand – James Busby
Additional British Resident in New Zealand – Thomas McDonnell until his resignation in July.

Events 
July
 – Additional British Resident in New Zealand, Thomas McDonnell resigns.
26 December – John Hughes, W.I. Haberfield and others from the Weller brothers whaling station at Otakou arrive in the Magnet and set up a whaling station on the north side of Moeraki Point.

Undated
Captain John Howell is sent by whaler and merchant Johnny Jones to establish a whaling station at Riverton to replace that recently abandoned at Preservation Inlet. (see also 1829 and 1835)
The Stone Store at Kerikeri, the oldest stone building in New Zealand, is completed mid-year.
Late in the year Alfred Nesbitt Brown closes the mission at Matamata. (see also 1835 & 1838)

Sport

Cricket

Births
 14 January (in England): Thomas Hocken, collector and bibliographer.

Unknown date
(in Ireland) Richard Reeves, politician.

See also
List of years in New Zealand
Timeline of New Zealand history
History of New Zealand
Military history of New Zealand
Timeline of the New Zealand environment
Timeline of New Zealand's links with Antarctica

References

External links